The Constables Protection Act 1750 (24 Geo. 2 c. 44) is an Act of the Parliament of Great Britain that gives "constables ... and other officers" protection from being sued for carrying out the orders of a justice of the peace.

Justices themselves have immunity from being sued for their own actions under sections 31-33 of the Courts Act 2003, except if they have acted outside their jurisdiction and in bad faith.

References

Great Britain Acts of Parliament 1750